Gagea amblyopetala is a Eurasian species of plants in the lily family, Liliaceae. It is native to the Aegean Islands, Albania, Crete, Crimea, Greece, Italy, Sicily, Turkey, Yugoslavia. It is a bulb-forming perennial with yellow flowers.

References

External links
Fotolibra color photo
Greek Flora in Greek with color photos

amblyopetala
Flora of the East Aegean Islands
Flora of Albania
Flora of Crete
Flora of the Crimean Peninsula
Flora of Greece
Flora of Italy
Flora of Sicily
Flora of Turkey
Flora of Yugoslavia
Plants described in 1846
Taxa named by Pierre Edmond Boissier
Taxa named by Theodor von Heldreich